New Central Jail Bahawalpur is a jail in Bahawalpur, Pakistan located on Jail Road nearly one kilometer toward east of the Radio Pakistan Bahawalpur. In September 2006, four members of the same family, including one father, his two sons and one brother, were hanged to death in this jail. The jail has been declared as Model Jail by the Government of the Punjab, Home Department in the year 2010.

History
The jail was built in 1955 when the Old Central Jail Bahawalpur was declared as Borstal Institution & Juvenile Jail. It was constructed with a view to confine long-term and life prisoners of Bahawalpur Division.

Prison industries

Following prison industries are functioning in the jail to train the convicted prisoners in various trades and handicrafts so that they could earn their living after release form Jail, utilise prison labour in profitable works for benefit of state exchequer, and to keep the prisoners busy in useful tasks.

 Prisoner Durree Weaving Unit
 Carpet Knitting Unit
 Niwar Knitting Unit
 School and Office Furniture Manufacturing Unit

The school and office furniture manufactured at the Jail is supplied to all educational institutions in the districts of Bahawalpur, Bahawalnagar, Lodhran and Rahim Yar Khan.

See also
 Government of Punjab, Pakistan
 Punjab Prisons (Pakistan)
 Central Jail Faisalabad
 Central Jail Lahore
 Central Jail Mianwali
 Prison Officer
 Headquarter Jail
 Central Jail Rawalpindi
 District Jail Rawalpindi
 District Jail Jhelum
 National Academy for Prisons Administration
 Punjab Prisons Staff Training Institute

References

External links
 Official Website of Punjab Prisons (Pakistan)

Prisons in Pakistan
Buildings and structures in Bahawalpur